Poznań Antoninek railway station is a railway station serving the city of Poznań, in the Greater Poland Voivodeship, Poland. The station is located on the Warsaw–Kunowice railway. The train services are operated by Przewozy Regionalne and Koleje Wielkopolskie.

Train services
The station is served by the following service(s):

Regional services (R) Leszno - Poznan
Regional services (KW) Poznan - Wrzesnia - Konin - Kutno

Bus services

66 (Poznan, Rondo Rataje - Os. Lecha - Os. Rusa - Poznan Antoninek - Zielniec)

References

 This article is based upon a translation of the Polish language version as of April 2016.

External links
 

Antoninek
Railway stations in Greater Poland Voivodeship
Railway stations served by Przewozy Regionalne InterRegio